Hertfordshire bus route 84 is a commercial bus service running in Hertfordshire. Running between St Albans and Potters Bar, it is operated by Sullivan Buses.

History

Route 84 commenced operating on 3 August 1912 between St Albans and Golders Green. It was operated by the London General Omnibus Company as a feeder service to the Charing Cross, Euston & Hampstead Railway which at that time terminated at Golders Green.

Route 84 used to reach further into London: in 1936 it ran from St Albans to Golders Green, albeit omitting Potters Bar itself by running via New Road. As a wartime economy, from May 1940, route 84 was withdrawn south of Whetstone, being diverted to Arnos Grove station instead. In August 1969 it was cut back to Barnet and diverted to New Barnet station. Operation of the route passed from London Regional Transport to London Country Bus Services in 1982. In 1986 it reverted to being a London Transport operated route.

From 2 January 2012, the route no longer accepted Transport for London tickets as the partial subsidy from Transport for London was withdrawn.

In February 2022, Metroline announced that it intended to withdraw the route in April that year. However, after a petition of over 6000 and local protests, Sullivan Buses declared that they would operate a new route between Potters Bar and St Albans with financial support from Hertfordshire County Council. The route number was subsequently confirmed to be remaining the same, although with the Potters Bar to Barnet section withdrawn.

On 2 April 2022, Sullivan Buses took over the route and a half-hourly service on Mondays to Saturdays and hourly services on Sunday and Public Holidays.

Route
Route 84 operates via these primary locations:
St Albans St Peter's Street
St Albans City station 
London Colney
South Mimms
Potters Bar station

References

Glover, John (2006) - London Country

External links

Bus routes in England
Bus routes in London
Transport in the London Borough of Barnet
Transport in Hertfordshire
Transport in St Albans